This article lists some of the events from 1951 related to the Netherlands.

Incumbents
Monarch: Juliana
Prime Minister: Willem Drees

Events
3 March: The Islands Regulation of the Netherlands Antilles is enacted by royal decree, describing the autonomy of the island territories of the Netherlands Antilles.
18 April: Moises Frumencio da Costa Gomez becomes Prime Minister of the Netherlands Antilles.
date unknown: Broadcasting time is officially allocated to television by the national broadcasting companies in the Netherlands.

Sports
 1951–52 Netherlands Football League Championship

Births
12 March: Harry Dijksma, politician
17 September: Piet Kleine, speed skater and coach
15 October: A. F. Th. van der Heijden, author
15 December: Jacob ter Veldhuis, composer
14 December: Jan Timman, chess player

Undated
Paul Schellekens, civil servant and diplomat

Deaths
21 March: Willem Mengelberg, conductor (b. 1871)
21 April: Lambertus Johannes Toxopeus, lepidopterist (b. 1894)

References

 

 
Netherlands
1950s in the Netherlands
Netherlands